The 2021 European Modern Pentathlon Championships will be held from 5 to 11 July 2021 in Nizhny Novgorod, Russia.

Medal summary

Men's events

Women's events

Mixed events

Medal table

References

External links
Official site

2021
2021 in modern pentathlon
2021 in Russian sport
July 2021 sports events in Russia
Modern pentathlon competitions in Russia
Sport in Nizhny Novgorod